Winter Sleepers ( meaning "hibernators") is a 1997 German film directed by Tom Tykwer. It was premiered at the Locarno International Film Festival.

Plot

The film is set in the deeply snowy alpine winter resort of Berchtesgaden in Bavaria; the story begins shortly after Christmas Day, with five people returning, not all of whom are connected.

Laura, a surgical nurse, and Rebecca, a translator, live together in the house that Laura inherited from her great aunt. René is a projectionist in a cinema. Marco, Rebecca's boyfriend, is a skiing instructor who drives an expensive Alfa Romeo. Theo is a middle-aged farmer who lives with his wife Edith, their daughter, and two sons on a poor farm nearby.

When Marco arrives, he is greeted passionately by Rebecca, and tugged into the house. He leaves his car open outside, with the key still in the ignition. It is the early morning, and René, walking drunkenly home, passes the house, taking pictures, among other things, of Rebecca and Marco having sex inside. Finally, he climbs into the car and drives away. Theo, meanwhile, is taking his horse to the veterinarian, but doesn't let his daughter come with him. He doesn't notice when she sneaks into the horse trailer with the animal. Theo, distracted by his sons calling him on a walkie-talkie and driving on the wrong side of the road, almost collides with René. The Alfa Romeo crashes off the road and into a snowdrift and Rene is not hurt; however, the horse trailer is flipped over and the girl and horse badly injured. Theo is dazed, but René, rather than helping, takes a photo of him, and as he walks off, Theo is stricken by a strange snake-like scar on the back of René's head.  When Theo is helped out of his truck by a passing driver, he shoots the injured horse on the spot and takes his daughter to the hospital where Laura works.

There, Laura hears Theo becoming obsessed with finding the man who caused the accident, to prove his own innocence: no-one believes that there was another car, because it is buried under snow. All he remembers was the shape of René's scar. The young girl is operated-on and is in a coma, between life and death.

Meanwhile, Marco reports the car theft to the police and becomes exasperated by their lack of progress, claiming they aren't taking the theft seriously. Rebecca is becoming discontent with her relationship with him; she sees him as taking her for granted, jealous without cause, and lacking ambition. Outside of their passionate sex life, they argue constantly. Laura befriends René after a play in which she was performing; he gives her a free pass for the cinema where he works, and eventually he shows her his photos, which he keeps in an album with numbers and dates. The reason he takes them is his short-term memory problems which were caused by a head injury while serving in the Army; without photos he would have no way of remembering places or people.

Theo and Edith have to shut the farm down because of debt and move to a smaller place near the resort. Theo draws a picture of the shape he remembers, copies it and sticks them up around town, appealing for anyone to come forward if they recognize the scar on the back of the head (like that of René). But Edith takes down all his posters, believing he is only trying to escape his own guilt and explaining that she's ashamed.

Marco has started an affair with Nina, a young student from the skiing class he teaches. He invites her to his boss's house one evening while his boss is out of town, pretending it is his. Later, he has to go to the hospital after burning himself on the coffee machine and is treated by Laura. While he is there, Theo's daughter dies.

Theo, investigating the site of the car crash again, finds the buried car and comes across documents showing Marco to be the owner. Theo goes to Marco's workplace (the ski area) and is told Marco is skiing in the mountains, with Nina. They become separated in fog, and Nina injures herself by falling off a ledge and onto a tree. After falling out of the tree, Nina staggers to Theo's new residence and is tended to by Edith.  Desperately trying to find Nina, Marco meets Theo on the mountainside where Theo sets his dog onto Marco.  When Marco demands to know what's happening, Theo explains only "You killed her."  Not knowing about Theo's daughter, Marco starts to panic about losing Nina.  After injuring Theo's aggressive German shepherd, Marco manages to ski hurriedly away before going over the edge of a cliff, and he falls, seemingly forever, into a crevasse in the valley, to his death.

In another coincidence, Rebecca and the injured Nina depart on the same train, but don't know each other. The film ends with the birth of René and Laura's child.

Production
The film is based on the novel Expense of Spirit by Anne-Françoise Pyszora;  however, this original story does not contain the character of Theo, and takes place in summer: Tykwer felt the film would be more attractive in a snowy winter setting. The story of the two couples is faithful to the novel.

The soundtrack album was released on 3 November 1997 on Ariola Records/BMG. It contains the songs "Untitled #1" by Spain and Fratres by Arvo Pärt. The CD is no longer in print.

References

External links

Entry at TomTykwer.com

1997 films
1997 romantic drama films
1990s German-language films
Films about amnesia
Films directed by Tom Tykwer
Films shot in Cologne
Films with screenplays by Tom Tykwer
Films scored by Tom Tykwer
Films scored by Reinhold Heil
Films scored by Johnny Klimek
German romantic drama films
1990s German films